Stewart Lemoine is a Canadian playwright, director, and producer. Lemoine was the Artistic Director of Teatro la Quindicina from 1982 to 2007. In 2008 he became Teatro's resident playwright, working on his own original comedies and mentoring the troupe's new writers at Old Strathcona's Varscona Theatre.

Lemoine has written over seventy plays in the course of his career. He is the winner of 9 Sterling Awards for The Glittering Heart (1990), The Book of Tobit (1993), The Noon Witch (1995), Pith (1998), At the Zenith of the Empire (2006), The Oculist's Holiday (2009), Witness to a Conga (2010), Cause and Effect and Marvelous Pilgrims (2013), and A Lesson in Brio (2018). He received a Dora Mavor Moore Award for The Vile Governess and Other Psychodramas (1986). He won the New York International Fringe Festival’s Award for Overall Excellence in Playwriting for the remount of Pith! in 2004. He received the Queen's Golden Jubilee Medal in 2003 and the Diamond Jubilee Medal in 2013. He received the Tommy Bank Performing Arts Award from the Province of Alberta in 2008, and in 2010 he was inducted into the City of Edmonton's Cultural Hall of Fame.

Works

Selected Plays
 All These Heels (1982) co-author Phil Zyp
 My Miami Melody (1985)
 The Vile Governess and Other Psychodramas (1986)
 Cocktails at Pam's (1986)
What Gives?  (1986) Music by R.J. Smart and Gary Lloyd
Neck-Breaking Car-Hop (1987)
Swiss Pajamas (1988)
Hopscotch Holiday (1900) Music by R.J. Smart and Gary Lloyd
Damp Fury (1988)
When Girls Collide (1989)
Teens in Togas (1989) (Music by Gary Lloyd)
All Ears (1989)
Planet of the Lost Swing Babes (1990) Music by Gary Lloyd
The Glittering Heart (1990)
The Swift Hotel (1990)
The Hothouse Prince (1991)
The Jazz Mother (1991)
A Night with Barbara (1991)
The Spanish Abbess of Pilsen (1992)
 Two Tall Too Thin (1992)
The Argentine Picnic and Other Lemoine Vignettes (1992)
 Shockers Delight! (1993)
 The Book of Tobit (1993)
The Delightful Garden of Saint Piquillo/The Visitation of the Paragon (1994)
 Connie in Egypt (1994)
 The Noon Witch (1995)
 Evelyn Strange (1995)
 Fall Down Go Boom: A Skater's Tragedy (1996)
Fatty Goes to College (1996)
 The Velvet Shock (1996)
The Lake of the Heart (1997)
Fatty's Big Show (1997)
 Pith! (1997)
Whiplash Weekend! (1997)
The Subject of My Affections (1998)
 The Rules of Irene (1998)
Tales of the Electress (1998) co-author Trevor Anderson
Fever-Land (1999)
Fatty Goes Wild (1999)
 Skirts on Fire (2000)
Orlando Unhinged (2001)
 On the Banks of the Nut (2001)
 Eros and the Itchy Ant (2002) Musical sequence composed by Ryan Sigurdson
 The Exquisite Hour (2002)
 Vidalia (2002)
Caribbean Muskrat (2003) co-author Josh Dean
 The Margin of the Sky (2003)
 The Salon of the Talking Turk (2005)
 A Momentary Lapse (2005) co-author Jocelyn Ahlf
 A Grand Time in the Rapids (2005)
 At the Zenith of the Empire (2005)
 Hey, Countess! (2006)
 East of My Usual Brain (2007)
Revenge of the South Sea Bubble 2008
 A Rocky Night for His Nibs (2008)
 Happy Toes (2008)
The Addlepated Nixie (2009)
Mother of the Year (2009)
The Oculist's Holiday (2009)
The Seersucker Toady (2010)
The Ambassador's Wives (2010)
Witness to a Conga (2010)
The Scent of Compulsion (2011)
Mrs. Lindeman Proposes... (2011)
The Hoof and Mouth Advantage (2011) co-author Jocelyn Ahlf
The Adulteress (2012)
Angels on Horseback (2012) co-author Jocelyn Ahlf
Cause and Effect (2013) 
Marvelous Pilgrims (2013)
The Euphorians (2014)
Saint Albert (2015)
For the Love of Cynthia (2016)
A Second Round of Seconds (2016)
I Heard About Your Murder (2017)
The Charm Offensive (2017)
The Finest of Strangers (2018)
The Many Loves of Irene Sloane (2018)
A Lesson in Brio (2018)
A Likely Story (2019)
Best Foot Sideways (2019)

References

External links
 Teatro la Quindicina
 Varscona Theatre 
 Die-Nasty
 Oh Susanna! 
 Stewart Lemoine

Year of birth missing (living people)
Living people
20th-century Canadian dramatists and playwrights
21st-century Canadian dramatists and playwrights
Canadian theatre directors
Dora Mavor Moore Award winners
Canadian male dramatists and playwrights
20th-century Canadian male writers
21st-century Canadian male writers
Place of birth missing (living people)